This is a list of Members of Parliament (MPs) elected to the State Great Khural at the 2016 legislative election.

Composition

Constituency

References

Elections in Mongolia